Abdulrahman Al-Hurib (born February 5, 1992) is a Saudi professional footballer who plays for Al-Adalah as a midfielder.

References

External links 
 

1992 births
Living people
Saudi Arabian footballers
Hajer FC players
Al-Rawdhah Club players
Al Jeel Club players
Al-Adalah FC players
Saudi First Division League players
Saudi Professional League players
Saudi Second Division players
Association football midfielders